Oru Sandesam Koodi is a 1985 Indian Malayalam-language film, directed by Cochin Haneefa and produced by R. S. Sreenivasan. The film stars Mammootty, Prem Nazir, Rohini and Cochin Haneefa. It was remake of Kudumbam Oru Kadambam The musical score is by Shyam.

Plot
Vijayan, Prasad and Gopi are shown living in a rental home. They struggle to pay the rent. On one occasion the owner tries to evict them, but they are not willing to leave.

Vijayan is a drunk and a local rowdy. His mother, younger brother Raju and sister Rama live with him. Vijayan is not willing to get a job, and does nothing for his family. He drinks and starts fights in the market. His younger brother, Raju, is like him, but has an interest in politics. Their sister Rama is an SSLC student. Their mother is the only source of income. She becomes a servant in some neighbors' homes.

Cast
Mammootty as Vijayan
Jagathy Sreekumar as Raju
Rohini as Rama
Kamala Kamesh as Lakshmiyamma
Cochin Haneefa as Chandran
Shankar Panikkar as Gopy
Kunchan as Kadara Kunjunni
Unnimary as Rajani
Jose as Unnikrishnan
Ragini as Shari
Nedumudi Venu as Prasad
Bahadoor as Rajashekharan Nair
Paravoor Bharathan as House Owner
Prem Nazir as Cameo Appearance

Soundtrack
The music was composed by Shyam with lyrics by R. K. Damodaran.

References

External links
 

1985 films
1980s Malayalam-language films
Films directed by Cochin Haneefa